This is a list of universities in Saint Kitts and Nevis.

Universities 
 Clarence Fitzroy Bryant College
 International University for Graduate Studies
 International University of the Health Sciences 
 Medical University of the Americas
 Ross University School of Veterinary Medicine
 Ross International University of Nursing
 St. Theresa's Medical University (St. Kitts)
 University of Medicine and Health Sciences 
 University of the West Indies Open Campus (St. Kitts campus)
 Windsor University School of Medicine
 Panamerican University of Natural Medicine ( Monastic/on Line)
 STC Technological University
 STC Technological University Overseas Campus in Myanmar

See also 
 List of universities by country

References

 
Universities
Saint Kitts and Nevis
Saint Kitts and Nevis

Universities